Mangrum is the surname of the following people:
Jim "Dandy" Mangrum (born 1948), lead singer for the American Southern rock band Black Oak
Joe Mangrum (born 1969), American installation and multiple-medium artist
Lloyd Mangrum (1914–1973), American golfer 
Ray Mangrum (1910–1975), American golfer, brother of Lloyd 
Richard C. Mangrum (1906–1985), United States Marine Corps lieutenant general